Colonel John Silver (c. 1665 – 1724) was a member of the Irish House of Commons.

Biography
He was the son of John Silver of Youghal by his wife Elizabeth, daughter of Charles Oliver. He married Joan, daughter and heiress of Blayney Sandford; their daughter Jane Catherine married Robert Oliver and her son Silver Oliver inherited his grandmother's estates.

Silver represented Rathcormack from 1703 to 1713, and was a supporter of the government.

References

1660s births
1724 deaths
Irish MPs 1703–1713
Members of the Parliament of Ireland (pre-1801) for County Cork constituencies